1710 Naval Air Squadron is a support organisation based in HM Naval Base Portsmouth that is tasked with the recovery, repair, modification and scientific support of UK military aviation. It was formed on 27 May 2010 by combining the existing  Mobile Aircraft Repair Transport and Salvage Unit (MARTSU), Mobile Aircraft Support Unit (MASU), Naval Aircraft Materials Laboratory (NAML) and other smaller units.

The squadron is currently organised into three sections. The first has thirteen teams that repair and recover British military helicopters and unmanned air systems worldwide. The second, Service Modification, designs, manufactures and fits urgent operational and safety modifications to front line helicopters. The third, Materials and Monitoring, provides
technical and scientific support to British military and commercial aviation.

The unit supports worldwide operations both ashore and afloat.

References

External links 
  Royal Navy, 1710 Squadron website

1700 series Fleet Air Arm squadrons

Military units and formations established in 2010
2010 establishments in the United Kingdom